Panto may refer to:

 Pantomime, a genre of musical comedy stage production, developed in England and mostly performed during Christmas and New Year season
American pantomime, theatre entertainments in North America derived from the English entertainment genre of Pantomime
 Panto (surname)
 Pantograph (rail), an overhead current collector for a tram or electric train
 Pantoprazole, a proton pump inhibitor
 Panto!, a 2012 ITV Christmas special

See also

 Big Brother Panto, a 2004–2005 series of the UK TV show Big Brother
 ITV Panto, a series of pantomimes originally broadcast on ITV in 1998, 2000, and 2002
Pantos (disambiguation)